John Johnston was a professional footballer who played as a full-back for Sunderland and Motherwell.

References

Association football fullbacks
Dalziel Rovers F.C. players
Cambuslang Rangers F.C. players
Sunderland A.F.C. players
Motherwell F.C. players
English Football League players
Scottish Junior Football Association players
Scottish Football League players
Scottish footballers